Yujiulü Anluochen (pinyin: Yùjiǔlǘ Ānluóchén) (?–554) was the last khagan of the Rouran (553–554) in the east. He was the son of Yujiulü Anagui.

During reign of Anagui 
He was married to Princess Le'an (乐安公主), daughter of Gao Cheng in 541. The khagan sent 1,000 horses and asked to bring the princess, who was now renamed Princess Lanling (兰陵公主). In view of the importance of an alliance with the Rouran, Gao Huan personally presided the collection of the dowry and led the princess and her retinue to Rouran. Anagui was very pleased with the marriage. He was in the party of refugees that went for Northern Qi after Anagui's fall in 552.

Reign 
Being a son-in-law to Northern Qi, he was supported by Emperor Wenxuan of Northern Qi against Tujue. Emperor personally attacked the Tujue, fighting its army off, and then created Yujiulü Anluochen as the new khagan of Rouran, settling the Rouran people within Northern Qi territory, at Mayi (馬邑, in modern Shuozhou, Shanxi). Despite it, he rebelled in September 554, led more than 50,000 people to attack on Qi borders.  Emperor Wenxuan again personally led his army and defeated Anluochen. He made yet another attack in April towards Si Prefecture (肆州, later Dai Prefecture, nowadays in northern Shanxi), but was repulsed. Meanwhile 30000 of his people were captured, women and children were enslaved. He made last attack on Yingzhou (营州, now Chaoyang, Liaoning) in 554 and utterly defeated. His whereabouts are unknown.

Family 
His daughter Yujiulü Chidelian (郁久閭叱地連) was married to Emperor Wucheng of Northern Qi and was created Princess Linhe (d. 550). Her tomb was discovered in 1970s.

References

Sources 

 Zhizhi Tongjian, vol. 165

 

Anluochen